Matthew Edward Duffy (born February 6, 1989) is an American former professional baseball corner infielder. He played in Major League Baseball (MLB) for the Houston Astros, and in Nippon Professional Baseball (NPB) for the Chiba Lotte Marines.

Career

Amateur

Duffy attended Saint Sebastian's School in Needham, Massachusetts. He enrolled at the University of Vermont and played college baseball for the Vermont Catamounts in 2008 and 2009. In 2009, Duffy was named the America East Conference's Player of the Year. After the 2009 season, he played collegiate summer baseball with the Chatham Anglers of the Cape Cod Baseball League. After Vermont discontinued its baseball team, he transferred to the University of Tennessee and played for the Tennessee Volunteers for two years.

Houston Astros

The Houston Astros selected Duffy in the 20th round of the 2011 Major League Baseball Draft. In 2015, he was named the Pacific Coast League (PCL) MVP.

Duffy was called up to the majors for the first time on September 14, 2015.

On Friday, October 2, 2015, Duffy contributed to Houston Astros history, breaking the club record by surpassing 20 runs in a game with his two-run single off A.J. Schugel for Houston's final runs against the Arizona Diamondbacks.

Texas Rangers
On July 16, 2016, Duffy was designated for assignment by the Astros and claimed by the Texas Rangers on July 23, 2016.

Chiba Lotte Marines
On November 14, 2016, Duffy signed with the Chiba Lotte Marines of Nippon Professional Baseball.

Matt Duffy Baseball Academy
Duffy is the current owner and founder of the Matt Duffy Baseball Academy which opened in July 2019, located in Weymouth, MA. Duffy offers instruction for both individuals and groups. The MDBA is also home to the MDB Knights, a club baseball team for youth baseball players.

References

External links

Tennessee Volunteers bio

1989 births
Living people
American expatriate baseball players in Japan
Baseball players from Boston
Chatham Anglers players
Chiba Lotte Marines players
Corpus Christi Hooks players
Fresno Grizzlies players
Houston Astros players
Lancaster JetHawks players
Lexington Legends players
Major League Baseball first basemen
Major League Baseball third basemen
Nippon Professional Baseball first basemen
Nippon Professional Baseball third basemen
Oklahoma City RedHawks players
Pacific Coast League MVP award winners
Tennessee Volunteers baseball players
Tri-City ValleyCats players
Vermont Catamounts baseball players